Laurent Mekies (born 28 April 1977) is a French engineer working as assistant team principal and race director for Scuderia Ferrari.

Career
Mekies graduated from Loughborough University after obtaining a master's degree from the École supérieure des techniques aéronautiques et de construction automobile in Paris. In 2000, he started his career at Asiatech in Formula Three before entering Formula One, working for Arrows. He switched to Minardi in the following years, where he worked as the race engineer for Mark Webber, Justin Wilson, Zsolt Baumgartner and Christijan Albers.

When the team was acquired by the Austrian energy drink maker Red Bull and renamed as Scuderia Toro Rosso at the end of 2005, he was promoted to be the team's chief engineer.

Mekies left the Faenza-based team to join the FIA in 2014 as safety director and was appointed F1 deputy race director in 2017. He moved to Scuderia Ferrari in September 2018 as sporting director. He has been in charge of the Track and Performance department since 2019. In January 2021, he was appointed as Deputy Team Principal and Racing Director of Scuderia Ferrari.

References

1977 births
Living people
Alumni of Loughborough University
Ferrari people
Formula One engineers
French automotive engineers
French motorsport people
Engineers from Tours, France
French expatriates in England
French expatriates in Italy